Büsching may refer to:

 Anton Friedrich Büsching (1724–1793), German geographer, historian, educator and theologian
 Johann Gustav Gottlieb Büsching (1783–1829), German antiquary
 Büsching (crater), a lunar impact crater

See also
 Bushing (disambiguation)